Raphael Miceli (born 30 April 1976 in Belgium) is a Belgian retired footballer.

References

Association football wingers
Association football midfielders
Belgian footballers
Living people
1976 births
R.F.C. Seraing (1922) players
R.C.S. Verviétois players
Standard Liège players
RC Strasbourg Alsace players
Le Havre AC players
RFC Liège players
S.C. Eendracht Aalst players